To the Finland Station: A Study in the Writing and Acting of History (1940) is a book by American critic and historian Edmund Wilson. The work presents the history of revolutionary thought and the birth of socialism, from the French Revolution through the collaboration of Marx and Engels to the arrival of Lenin at the Finlyandsky Rail Terminal in St. Petersburg in 1917.

Form and content
Wilson "had the present book in mind for six years".

The book is divided into three sections.

The first spends five of eight chapters on Michelet and then discusses the "Decline of Revolutionary Tradition," referencing Ernest Renan, Hippolyte Taine, and Anatole France.

The second deals with Socialism and Communism in sixteen chapters. The first four chapters discuss the "Origins of Socialism" vis-à-vis Babeuf, Saint-Simon, Fourier and Robert Owen, and Enfantin as well as the "American Socialists" Margaret Sanger and Horace Greeley. The second group of twelve chapters deal mostly with the development of thought in Karl Marx in light of his influences, partnership with Friedrich Engels and opposition from Lassalle and Bakunin.

The third spends six chapters, dealing two each on Lenin, Trotsky, and Lenin again. Important writings addressed include Lenin's "What Is to Be Done?" and Trotsky's Literature and Revolution, My Life, biography of Lenin, and The History of the Russian Revolution.

The book also mentions Eleanor Marx, Nadezhda Krupskaya, Annie Besant, Charles Bradlaugh and Georgy Gapon.

Publication

Harcourt, Brace & Co. first published this book in September 1940. Doubleday's Anchor Books imprint published a paperback edition in 1953. Farrar, Straus and Giroux published a paperback edition in 1972. The New York Review of Books published a new edition in 2003, with an introduction by Louis Menand.

Upon publication, TIME said:

Because it makes Marxist theory, aims and tactics intelligible to any literate non-Marxist mind, To the Finland Station is an invaluable book. It is an advantage that, like Milton with the character of Satan, Author Wilson is half in love with the human side of the curious specimens he describes.

To the Finland Station was one of the first four books ever published by major Brazilian publisher Companhia das Letras. The book's translation proved to be a successful seller.

In popular culture
This book is mentioned as the reading matter of a young Bill Clinton in Hillary Clinton's biography Living History. A tongue in cheek reference is made in the Pet Shop Boys' song "West End Girls" in the lyrics "from Lake Geneva to the Finland Station". The Harvard Lampoons Bored of the Rings includes a tongue-in-cheek dedication, "TO The Finland Station".

See also

 Babeuf
 Claude Henri de Rouvroy, comte de Saint-Simon
 Enfantin
 Friedrich Engels
 Fourier
 Vladimir Lenin
 Karl Marx
 Robert Owen
 Trotsky
 Edmund Wilson

References

1940 non-fiction books
20th-century history books
History books about socialism
History books about the French Revolution
History books about the Russian Revolution
Socialism
Harcourt (publisher) books